The Great Fire of Hakodate is a fire that broke out in Hakodate, Hokkaido in Japan on March 21, 1934. It is one of the worst city fires in Japan.

Overview 
On March 21, 1934 a fire was started in a house located within the Sumiyoshi area, Hakodate. Over two days, burning debris, fanned by strong winds, set fire to the surrounding areas including a local court, department store, school, and hospital. According to official documents, 2,166 people lost their lives, with 9,485 injured; 145,500 people made homeless and 11,055 buildings lost. A serious fire destroyed around two-thirds of all buildings in Hakodate. This event also led to many residents leaving and subsequently depopulating the city.

References

External links 

 函館大火 - 函館市消防本部
 昭和9年の大火概況 - 函館市史
 1934年3月23日付大阪毎日新聞 - 神戸大学附属図書館新聞記事文庫
 昭和9年函館大火の記録映像 1934年3月21日 - YouTube

Hakodate
March 1934 events
Fires in Japan
1934 fires in Asia
1934 disasters in Japan